, lit. "Quick Change Tanuki Palace"), is a 1954 black-and-white Japanese film directed by Tatsuo Ohsone.

Cast 
 Hibari Misora
 Shunji Sakai
 Chizuko Ashihara
 Chikako Miyagi
 Kōkichi Takada
 Frankie Sakai

References

External links 
 

Japanese black-and-white films
1954 films
Shochiku films
1950s Japanese films